This is a combined list of all national, state, and local landmarks and historic places in San Francisco, California.  Some locations appear on multiple lists.

National

State

Local

See also
List of World Heritage Sites in the United States
American Institute of Architects

References

External Lists
National Park Service National Historic Landmarks Program 
National Park Service National Register of Historic Places
California State Parks Office of Historic Preservation
San Francisco Planning Department Historic Preservation